Monolith of Inhumanity is the fifth studio album by American death metal band Cattle Decapitation, released on May 8, 2012. Upon its release, it was met with positive reviews praising the addition of melody into their sound.

Promotion
Music videos were released for "Kingdom of Tyrants," "Forced Gender Reassignment," and "Your Disposal."
A 7" single for "Your Disposal" was released in mid-2013. The B-side is "An Exposition of Insides," previously only available on the Japanese version of the album. The music video for "Forced Gender Reassignment" was written and directed by Mitch Massie. The uncensored music video, which depicts members of the Westboro Baptist Church being abducted and given sex reassignment surgery, is available for viewing on the website Bloody Disgusting with permission from the band.

Reception

Critical reception 

Upon its release Monolith of Inhumanity generally received favorable reviews from critics. On Metacritic, it has been given a score of 79% based on 5 reviews.

Public reception
The album also was voted the best album of 2012 by Metal Injection readers. On the MetalSucks series "The Best Metal Albums of 2012, As Chosen by Metal Musicians Themselves," Sven de Caluwé of Aborted, Richie Cavalera of Incite, David Davidson and Dan Gargiulo both of Revocation, Charles Elliott of Abysmal Dawn, Jeremy Wagner formerly of Broken Hope, John Vail formerly of Wretched, and Leon del Muerte of Murder Construct included Monolith of Inhumanity on their lists.

Track listing

Personnel 
Writing, performance and production credits are adapted from the album liner notes.

Cattle Decapitation 
 Travis Ryan – vocals, electronics, atmospherics, keyboard, drums on "The Monolith"
 Josh Elmore – guitar, gang vocals on "The Carbon Stampede"
 Derek Engemann – bass, additional vocals, gang vocals on "The Carbon Stampede", additional guitar and keyboard on "The Monolith"
 Dave McGraw – drums, gang vocals on "The Carbon Stampede"

Guest musicians 
 Leonard Leal (Cephalic Carnage) – vocals on "A Living, Breathing Piece of Defecating Meat"
 Mike Majewski (Devourment) – vocals on "Projectile Ovulation"

Additional musicians 
 Cephalic Carnage:
 Leonard Leal – gang vocals on "The Carbon Stampede"
 Nick Schendzielos – gang vocals on "The Carbon Stampede"
 Steve Goldberg – gang vocals on "The Carbon Stampede"
 Brian Hopp – gang vocals on "The Carbon Stampede"
 John Merryman – gang vocals on "The Carbon Stampede"
 Zac Joe – gang vocals on "The Carbon Stampede"
 Jawsh Mullen – gang vocals on "The Carbon Stampede"
 Sean Perry – gang vocals on "The Carbon Stampede"
 John Wiese – electronics, atmospherics

Production 
 Dave Otero – production, mixing, mastering
 Shane Howard – engineering

Artwork and design 
 Wes Benscoter – album artwork, photo editing
 Brian Ames – album layout
 Sam Lanthrem – photography
 Matthew Zinke – photography
 Travis Ryan – art direction, concept

Studio 
 Flatline Audio, Westminster, CO, USA – production, mixing, mastering

Charts

References

External links
 
 Monolith of Inhumanity at Metal Blade

2012 albums
Albums produced by Dave Otero
Albums recorded at Flatline Audio
Albums with cover art by Wes Benscoter
Cattle Decapitation albums
Metal Blade Records albums
LGBT-related controversies in music
Obscenity controversies in music
Transgender-related music